SS Gopher State (T-ACS-4) is a crane ship in ready reserve for the United States Navy.  The ship was named for the state of Minnesota, which is also known as the Gopher State.

History 
Gopher State was laid down on 26 July 1971, as the container ship Export Leader, ON 545126, IMO 7226689, a Maritime Administration type C5-S-73b hull under MARAD contract (MA 257). Built by Bath Iron Works, Bath, Maine, hull no. 358, she was launched on 8 July 1972, and delivered to MARAD 22 January 1973, entering service for American Export-Isbrandtsen Lines (renamed American Export Lines in the same year). She was sold to Farrell Lines in 1978 without name change. The ship was returned to MARAD in 1986 and laid up in the National Defense Reserve Fleet (NDRF). In 1987 she was converted to a type C5-S-MA73c crane ship by Norfolk Shipbuilding & Drydock, Norfolk, Virginia. Completed on 12 October 1987, she was placed in service as Gopher State (T-ACS-4) and assigned to the Ready Reserve Force (RRF), under operation control of the Military Sealift Command (MSC).

Gopher State is in ready reserve, laid up at Newport News, Virginia. As of December 2016, she is in Drydock No. 3 in Boston.

See also
Operation Steel Box

References

Notes

Bibliography

Online 
U.S. Navy, 
U.S. Naval Register, []
 United States Navy Fact File - Crane Ships

External links

 Global Security.org - T-ACS Keystone State Auxiliary Crane Ships
 Global Security.org - T-ACS Keystone State Auxiliary Crane Ships specifications
 Navsource.org
 National Defense Reserve Fleet Inventory

 

1972 ships
Gopher State-class crane ships
Ships of American Export-Isbrandtsen Lines
Type C5 ships